Ghanaian Pidgin English (GhaPE), is a Ghanaian English-lexifier pidgin also known as Pidgin, Broken English, and Kru English (kroo brofo in Akan). GhaPE is a regional variety of West African Pidgin English spoken in Ghana, predominantly in the southern capital, Accra, and surrounding towns. It is confined to a smaller section of society than other West African creoles, and is more stigmatized, perhaps due to the importance of Twi, an Akan dialect, often spoken as lingua franca . Other languages spoken as lingua franca in Ghana are Standard Ghanaian English (SGE) and Akan.  GhaPE cannot be considered a creole as it has no L1 speakers.

GhaPE can be divided into two varieties, referred to as "uneducated" or "non-institutionalized" pidgin and "educated" or "institutionalized" pidgin. The former terms are associated with uneducated or illiterate people and the latter are acquired and used in institutions such as universities and are influenced by Standard Ghanaian English.

GhaPE, like other varieties of West African Pidgin English, is also influenced locally by the vocabulary of the indigenous languages spoken around where it developed. GhaPE's substrate languages such as Akan influenced use of the spoken pidgin in Ghana. Other influencers of GhaPE include Ga, Ewe, and Nzema. While females understand GhaPE, they are less likely to use it in public or professional settings. Mixed-gender groups more often converse in SGE or another language. Adults and children have traditionally not spoken GhaPE.

In some cases, educators have unsuccessfully attempted to ban the use of pidgin. Although other languages of Ghana are available to them, students, particularly males, use GhaPE as a means of expressing solidarity, camaraderie and youthful rebellion.  Today, this form of Pidgin can be heard in a variety of informal contexts, although it still carries a certain stigma. Specifically, GhaPE still carries stigma in academia which may explain why "few structural or sociolinguistic descriptions of the variety have been published". Contemporary GhaPE is spoken by 20% of the population with 5 million speakers. In general, pidgins are spoken in a wide range of situations and occasions including: "educational institutions, work places, airports, seaports, drinking places, markets, on the radio, popular songs, and on political platforms".

Nigerians who settled in Ghana and vice versa have been major factors in the development and use of the language. GhPE, like other varieties of West African Pidgin English is influenced locally by the vocabulary of the indigenous languages spoken around where it developed, in this case, as around the Greater Accra Region, largely Ga. When spoken, it can be difficult for Nigerian pidgin speakers to understand Ghanaian speakers – for instance, the words "biz" (which stands for "ask"), "kai" (which means "remember") and "gbeketii", meaning "in the evening", in the Standard Ghanaian English. 

Also, young educated men who were raised outside Accra and Tema very often do not know it until they come into contact with others who do at boarding-school in secondary school or at university. But that might be changing, as Accra-born students go to cities such as Ghana's second city Kumasi to study at university and so could help gain the language new diverse speakers.

Over the years, some young Ghanaian writers have taken to writing literary pieces such as short stories in GhPE as an act of protest. GhPE has also seen expression in songs and movies and in advertisements.

History

Exploration/Colonization 
The first European contact on the Gold Coast in West Africa was by Portuguese settlers in 1471 (15th century). A Portuguese pidgin was used in parts of Africa throughout the 16th and 17th centuries. This pidgin first developed when native speakers of West African languages were taken to Portugal in order to learn Portuguese for translating purposes during voyages. It is speculated that the Portuguese settlement on the Gold Coast may have been reason for the pidgin's continuation in West Africa. This Portuguese pidgin was used for 300 years along the Gold Coast "but probably never (developed) far beyond the jargon stage".

Nearly two-hundred years later the following their independence the Dutch "took over all of Portugal's possessions in West Africa by 1642" in the 17th century, however "few linguistic remnants" remained in West African Languages, dialects, or varieties. This could be because the Dutch did not settle amongst the West Africans they traded with.

The British colonized the Gold Coast of West Africa (now Ghana) in the 19th and 20th centuries from 1844 to 1957. The British had greater linguistic impact in West Africa as they were in greater contact with the indigenous people. GhaPE developed as masters required communication with their workers and was initially spoken by police corporals, watchmen, labourers, and domestic staff who were trying to keep pace with fast-paced English speakers.

Northern Ghanaians were some of the first to pidgin speakers as they were late in accessing formal education and were employed by masters.  "Migration of West Africans to and through Ghana in search of work"  have impacted GhaPE development greatly in the last century. Migrant workers came to Ghana in the 1920s, and during a Nigerian oil boom that brought Ghanaian workers to Nigeria. Usage of GhaPE peaked in the 1980s as foreigners, including Ghanaians, were expelled from Nigeria. Nigerian settler influence has played a major role in the development and use of the language.

Geographic distribution

Official status

Dialects/Varieties 
GhaPE is a variety of West African Pidgin English, signifying relationship with other regional pidgin varieties such as Nigerian Pidgin English. Though some word formations are regional in GhaPE, words are also sometimes borrowed from other regional varieties. GhaPE most commonly borrows "abi", "dey", and "ein" from Nigerian but uses its own word, "commot" frequently as well.  Because of Nollywood influence, it is fairly common for Ghanaians to understand Nigerian Pidgin. Furthermore, unlike Nigerian pidgin, the use of Ghanaian pidgin is gendered. 

Student Pidgin originated in prestigious Ghanaian all-male secondary schools in the 1960s–1970s, and there has been an ever-increasing number of female students now also using SP.

A particularly basic variety used by illiterate speakers is sometimes called "'Minimal Pidgin', (which was) sometimes used between Europeans and servants".

Regional Pidgin English is also spoken in Gambia, Liberia, Sierra Leone, Nigeria, and Cameroon.

Sounds/Phonology 
Phonology reflects the L1 of the speaker, in the case of GhaPE this includes Ghanaian languages from the Kwa language group.

For example, L1 speakers of Akan or Hausa replace /v/ with /b/ or /f/. Therefore [seven] would be pronounced /sɛbɛn/.

For phonological charts of GhaPE vowels and consonants see Joe K.Y.P. Amoako's extensive Ph.D. dissertation and research.

Grammar

Morphology 
GhaPE has no standardized orthography, research into morphology, syntax and phonology is limited.

Derivation 
Morphological processes of reduplication can derivate words in GhaPE. This process "affects verbs, nouns, attributive adjectives, time and manner adverbials, adverbs, and numerals". Reduplication can also show inflection by showing plurality of action amongst verbs.

Inflection 
GhaPE nouns can also show plurality similar to substrate Ghanaian languages by adding the suffix /-s/.

Articles 
Definite article /dɛ/

Indefinite article /sƆm/ 

Sometimes with singular nouns, the GhaPE indefinite article /sƆm/ varies with the SGE /ɛ/.

Sometimes with singular nouns, the GhaPE indefinite article /sƆm/ is replaced with the Nigerian Pidgin English /wan/.

Syntax

Sentence Structure 
The following example shows the declarative sentence structure SV(O).

à sabi buk

I know book

I am literate

Vocabulary/Lexis 
Amoako (2011) finds that most of the GhaPE lexis and some of its syntax comes from English  however it has likely been re-lexified by the more current Ghanaian English

Lexis examples 
"biz" (GhaPE) “ask” (SGE)

"kai" (GhaPE) "remember" (SGE)

"gbeketii" (GhaPE) "in the evening" (SGE)

Writing system 
GhaPE is primarily spoken and, like many pidgins, is rarely written and has no standardized orthography.

See also 
First Pidgin Musical Film

References

 
 

English-based pidgins and creoles of Africa